Burj Tehal Dass is a village in Shaheed Bhagat Singh Nagar district of Punjab State, India. The village is administrated by Sarpanch an elected representative of the village.

Demography 
As of 2011, Burj Tehal Dass has a total number of 158 houses and population of 903 of which 457 include are males while 446 are females according to the report published by Census India in 2011. The literacy rate of Burj Tehal Dass is 74.97%, lower than the state average of 75.84%. The population of children under the age of 6 years is 108 which is 11.96% of total population of Burj Tehal Dass, and child sex ratio is approximately 1160 as compared to Punjab state average of 846.

Most of the people are from Schedule Caste which constitutes 53.27% of total population in Burj Tehal Dass. The town does not have any Schedule Tribe population so far.

As per the report published by Census India in 2011, 245 people were engaged in work activities out of the total population of Burj Tehal Dass which includes 235 males and 10 females. According to census survey report 2011, 86.94% workers describe their work as main work and 13.06% workers are involved in Marginal activity providing livelihood for less than 6 months.

Education 
The village has Punjabi medium, co-ed primary school which provide education until class 5 and a middle school which provide education until class 8. The schools provide mid-day meal as per Indian Midday Meal Scheme and the meal prepared in school premises. As per Right of Children to Free and Compulsory Education Act the school provide free education to children between the ages of 6 and 14.

Amardeep Singh Shergill Memorial college Mukandpur and Sikh National College Banga are the nearest colleges.

Transport 

See also 
List of villages in India

References

External links 
 Tourism of Punjab 
 Census of Punjab
 Locality Based PINCode

Villages in Shaheed Bhagat Singh Nagar district